Sergey Georgievich Levchenko (Russian Cyrillic: Сергей Георгиевич Левченко, born November 2, 1953) is a Russian politician and member of the 8th State Duma. He served as the Governor of Irkutsk Oblast from 2015 to 2019. Previously, he was a deputy in the Russian State Duma from 2000 to 2015.

Biography
Sergey Levchenko was born on 2 November 1953 in Novosibirsk, Soviet Union. He graduated from the Novosibirsk State University of Architecture and Construction in 1976. He started his career in the Krasnoyarsk division of Stalkonstruktsiya, part of the Soviet Ministry of Installation and Special Construction Works. In 1982, he moved to a similar department in Angarsk.

In 1987, he began working for the Communist Party of the Soviet Union, on a district committee in Angarsk and, by 1991, rose to the First Secretary of the local party administration.

After the fall of the Soviet Union, he rejoined StahlKonstruktsiya as general director. He was elected to the first session of the Irkutsk Oblast legislative assembly. He ran for oblast Governor in 1997; but took only 18.8% of the vote against Boris Govorin.

In 1999, he was elected to the State Duma as a member of the Communist Party. He made a second run for Governor against Govorin in 2001, taking 23.9% to advance to the runoff election where he was defeated. He continued working in both the federal and oblast dumas for several years.

In 2015, he made a third run for the post of governor, this time taking on Sergey Eroschenko, who was acting Governor at the time. He won the race with 57.4% of the votes. 

In 2019, he resigned as governor according to a press release although news sources such as the BBC reported that he was dismissed. However, there had been speculation in the press about his possible dismissal since devastating floods affected Irkutsk Oblast in the summer of 2019. President Vladimir Putin and senior administration officials criticized Levchenko’s response to the flooding in which 25 people died. He was succeeded by Igor Kobzev. In addition to his flood response, the Irkutsk prosecutor opened an investigation on an illegal bear hunt in which the governor allegedly participated.

He is one of the 324 members of the State Duma the United States Treasury sanctioned on 24 March 2022 in response to the 2022 Russian invasion of Ukraine.

References

External links
Profile at official website of the Communist Party

1953 births
Living people
Russian communists
Communist Party of the Russian Federation members
Communist Party of the Soviet Union members
Politicians from Novosibirsk
21st-century Russian politicians
Governors of Irkutsk Oblast
Third convocation members of the State Duma (Russian Federation)
Fifth convocation members of the State Duma (Russian Federation)
Sixth convocation members of the State Duma (Russian Federation)
Eighth convocation members of the State Duma (Russian Federation)
Russian individuals subject to the U.S. Department of the Treasury sanctions